Robert Medill McBride (August 24, 1879 in McKeesport, Pennsylvania – April 10, 1970 in Philadelphia) was a publisher and author. He published works by James Branch Cabell and the later books of Frank Buck. He also published Jay Gelzer's first novel.

Early years
Robert Medill McBride was the son of the Reverend Dr. Samuel and Wilhelmina (Medill) McBride. Reverend Samuel McBride was president of the American Bible Union. Robert was educated in public schools.

Publishing
McBride started in publishing at Country Life in America. He founded Yachting magazine in 1907; took over House and Garden in 1908, Travel in 1910; and Lippincott's Monthly Magazine in 1914. He was a partner of Condé Montrose Nast in McBride, Nast & Co. After McBride and Nast separated, they remained on good terms, and McBride attended the wedding of Nast's son, Charles Coudert Nast, in 1928.

McBride began book publishing 1912, and founded a London publishing house in 1915. Among the books he published were the later works of Frank Buck, including Buck's autobiography, All In A Lifetime. In 1926 McBride published Thorne Smith's novel Topper, which was the basis for the 1937 screwball comedy Topper directed by Norman Z. McLeod and starring Cary Grant. McBride also published a series of travel books which he himself had written, some under the pen name Robert Medill or Marshall Reid. His name appeared frequently in the society columns of the New York Times during the 1920s, 1930s, and 1940s. He was a member of The Players Club and the Dutch Treat Club.

Obscenity Prosecution

McBride published James Branch Cabell's twelfth book, Jurgen, A Comedy of Justice (1919), which was the subject of a celebrated obscenity case shortly after its publication. The hero, Jurgen, who considers himself a "monstrous clever fellow", embarks on a journey through ever more fantastic realms, even to hell and heaven. Everywhere he goes, he winds up seducing the local women, including the Devil's wife.

The novel was denounced by the New York Society for the Suppression of Vice; which attempted to bring a prosecution for obscenity. The case went on for two years before Cabell and McBride won: the "indecencies" were double entendres that also had a perfectly decent interpretation, though it appeared that what had actually offended the prosecution most was a joke about papal infallibility.

Publisher’s Hoax
In 1924 McBride received a manuscript so terrible that it was funny. He published the book in a smart jacket, the critics praised it, but it did not sell. The lesson in this, according to McBride, is that honest books sell, dishonest ones don’t. McBride became so interested in hoaxes that he wrote a history of them.

Bankruptcy and later life
McBride, then located at 200 East 37th Street, New York, declared bankruptcy (chapter XI), October 27, 1948. The Outlet Book Company acquired much of his stock. Thereafter, calling his company Medill-McBride, he published a few books and continued to write. Outlet Book later acquired Medill-McBride. He died in Philadelphia in 1970 and is buried at the West Laurel Hill Cemetery, Plymouth Section, Lot 14 (Oberholtzer Family). A sister, Winona McBride Oberholtzer (1883–1973), survived him.

Bibliography
 Robert Medill McBride and Neil Pritchie. Great Hoaxes of All Time. Robert M. McBride, New York, 1956.
 Robert Medill McBride. Towns and People of Modern Poland. Robert M. McBride, New York, 1938.
 Robert Medill McBride. Towns and People of Modern Germany. Robert M. McBride, New York, 1936.
 Robert Medill McBride. Romantic Czechoslovakia. Robert M. McBride, New York, 1930. In November 1932, McBride received the Order of the White Lion 4th class from Czechoslovakia for this work.
 Robert Medill McBride. Furnishing with Antiques. Robert M. McBride, New York, 1939.
 Robert Medill McBride. Spanish Towns and People. Robert M. McBride, New York, 1928.
 Robert Medill McBride. A Treasury of Antiques. Robert M. McBride, New York, 1946.
 Robert Medill McBride. A little book of Brittany. Robert M. McBride, New York, 1913
 Robert Medill McBride. Hilltop Cities of Italy.  Robert M. McBride, New York, 1936.
 Robert Medill McBride. Norwegian towns and people: Vistas in the Land of the midnight sun. Robert M. McBride, New York, 1927.
 Marshall Reid (pseudonym of Robert Medill McBride). Horses and dogs of great men. Robert M. McBride, New York, 1952.
 Marshall Reid ed. (pseudonym of Robert Medill McBride). When You Build. Robert M. McBride, New York. 1946.
 Robert Medill (pseudonym of Robert Medill McBride). Sweden and its People. Robert M. McBride, New York. 1926.
 Robert Medill (pseudonym of Robert Medill McBride). Finland and its People. Robert M. McBride, New York. 1926.

References

American book publishers (people)
American male non-fiction writers
American travel writers
People from McKeesport, Pennsylvania
1879 births
1970 deaths
Officers of the Order of the White Lion
Writers from Pennsylvania
Obscenity controversies in literature
Burials at West Laurel Hill Cemetery